André Pettineroli (20 December 1902 – 3 October 1978) was a Swiss sculptor. His work was part of the sculpture event in the art competition at the 1928 Summer Olympics.

References

1902 births
1978 deaths
20th-century Swiss sculptors
Swiss sculptors
Olympic competitors in art competitions
People from Lausanne
20th-century Swiss male artists